Theological studies may refer to:

 Theology, the academic discipline
 Theological Studies (journal), an academic journal published in the United States
Theological Studies/Teologiese Studies, an academic journal published in South Africa